The Lost Future is a 2010 South African-German post-apocalyptic film from Syfy, directed by Mikael Salomon and written by Jonas Bauer. The film stars Sean Bean, Corey Sevier and Sam Claflin. It was released on DVD on 27 September 2011.

Plot 

In post-apocalyptic Colombia, a group of survivors are organised as a tribe, a primitive society without technology. They form a small village in the Grey Rock National Park where they hunt various beasts, and try to avoid the human-like mutants because they transmit a disease that transforms the victims into mutants. The tribal leader is Uri, whose son Savan is the best hunter of the tribe and his father's successor. Kaleb is the best tracker, and an under-appreciated hunter. Kaleb and his sister Miru (Eleanor Tomlinson) are the only literate survivors in the tribe, taught by their father Jaret before he went missing. Jaret believed other survivors might exist outside the park and went searching for them. Kaleb, a dreamer, is secretly in love with Savan's woman, Dorel. When the mutants attack, the remaining members of the tribe, to include Miru, run to a cave and block the entrance with heavy logs. Some of the young hunters say they should fight the mutants, but the tribal elder says they should pray, and if they die or are turned into a mutant then it was God's will. Kaleb saves Dorel from a mutant, at which point they become romantically involved while Savan looks on. The three leave to find help to save the rest of their tribe.

Out of the blue, the stranger Amal approaches the trio and invites them to join his family, composed of his wife Neenah and their son Persk, who live in the outskirts of Grey Rock across a river. Amal reveals that mutants don't like water and can't swim, which is why he and his family live on the other side of the river and are safe from the mutants in the area. After arriving at his home, Amal discloses that he knew Jaret, and that he had discovered a yellow powder formula that cures people infected by the mutant virus as long as they have not completed the transformation. However, Gagen, the ruthless leader of another larger tribe, had killed Jaret and stolen the yellow powder and the formula and kept it hidden somewhere in his city. Amal, Savan, Kaleb and Dorel travel together towards Gagen's city to find the yellow powder in order to save their tribe. Amal lights a signal fire atop an old monolith hoping a nearby friendly tribe, called The Brotherhood, will come to their aid. Mutants attack the group and Amal is injured, forcing the other three to continue the journey without him.

After Savan and Dorel are captured by Gagen's men, it's revealed that Dorel is infected. Kaleb finds his father's notes on how to prepare the yellow powder in an ancient and disused library in the city. Gagen's daughter is sympathetic to their cause, and she tricks Gagen into revealing the hidden location of the powder to Kaleb. Once Kaleb administers some of the powder to Dorel, the trio escape across a perilous rope bridge. Savan is killed by Gagen when he sacrifices himself at the rope bridge to delay Gagen and his men, giving Kaleb and Dorel a chance to get away. They come across a healthy Amal who has brought three of The Brotherhood's horses with him, and they ride back to their tribe as fast as they can. The Brotherhood arrives at Kaleb and Dorel's village and easily kill all of the mutants. Kaleb, Dorel, and Amal arrive and begin giving out doses of the powder to their tribe, saving an infected Miru. Gagen has trailed them to the village and attacks, wanted the yellow powder back. Amal dives in front of Kaleb to block an arrow shot at him by Gagen, and Kaleb throws his battle axe at Gagen, killing him. Fortunately, Amal has only suffered a flesh wound, and Kaleb and Dorel take him home to his family after a few days. A short time later, Miru is seen teaching the tribe's children how to read and write. Kaleb stops to say goodbye, and then sets off for the city library, knowing it is safe to return there now that Gagen is dead. His new goal is to finish his father's work on the yellow powder and save humanity from the mutant virus.

Cast
 Sam Claflin as Kaleb
 Eleanor Tomlinson as Miru, Kaleb's Sister
 Sean Bean as Amal
 Corey Sevier as Savan
 Annabelle Wallis as Dorel
 Jessica Haines as Neenah
 Hannah Tointon as Giselle
 Jonathan Pienaar as Gagen
 Danny Keogh as Yisir
 Garth Breytenbach as Remi
 Bjorn Steinbach as Yomack
 Sam Schein as Persk

Production 
The Lost Future was filmed in and around Cape Town, South Africa.

Release 
The Lost Future premiered on Syfy 13 November 2010 and was released on DVD on 27 September 2011 by Entertainment One. It includes a making-of featurette and cast and crew interviews.

There was controversy over the rating of the film; it had been intended as a 12A, but due to an explicit sex scene, was rated as a 15.

Reception 
Scott Foy of Dread Central rated the film 2/5 stars and wrote that "this was a classier piece of cinema than the typical schlock Syfy produces", but it is too rushed, has too many characters and dangling storylines, and the action sequences can not make up for the shortcomings. Rod Lott of the Oklahoma Gazette wrote that the film "should be 'Lost' forever" and concluded, "Yeah, I hated it."  The Daily Sun wrote that the acting, writing, and special effects were good, but the cast were too clean and pretty to be convincing.

References

External links
 
 

2010 television films
2010 films
2010s science fiction films
2010s survival films
German science fiction films
German television films
English-language television shows
Television series by Tandem Productions
Films set in Colombia
Syfy original films
German post-apocalyptic films
Films shot in South Africa
Films directed by Mikael Salomon
2010s English-language films
2010s American films
2010s German films
RTL (German TV channel) original programming
Films about mutants